Jane Whiteside (5 February 1855 – 17 January 1875) was a notable New Zealand tightrope dancer, gymnast and magician. She was born in Tullylish, County Down, Ireland in 1855, to John Whiteside (a weaver) and Jane Whiteside.

When she was young, her father joined the 65th Regiment and moved the family to New Zealand. They sailed on the Lancashire Witch on April 17th, 1856, eventually landing in Wellington on July 21st. The family moved around several times, eventually settling in Otahuhu.

Whiteside first studied as an acrobat, tight-wire walker, and trapeze artist, but may have given it up as the result of an accident at age 17. She then turned to magic instead, after seeing the American magician Cora De Lamond (born Ursula Bush) perform.

She eventually joined Frank Verten and Harry Seymour's theatre company Oxford Combination Troupe. She used various stage names, including Mademoiselle Estella, Madame Blanche, Blanche Fane, and Miss Blanche Anderson. She eventually married Verten.

She died after drowning in New Zealand, at the border of Otago and Canterbury. She is buried at the Old Oamaru Cemetery.

References

People from County Down
1855 births
1875 deaths
New Zealand female dancers
Irish emigrants to New Zealand (before 1923)
19th-century British dancers
Deaths by drowning in New Zealand
Tightrope walkers
Female magicians
New Zealand magicians